Khorolsky District may refer to:
Khorolsky District, a district of Primorsky Krai, Russia
Khorolskyi District, a district of Poltava Oblast, Ukraine